Wen Chen-ling (born October 23, 1992) is a Taiwanese actress and television host.

Life and career 
Wen's mother is Chinese Filipino. Her father is of Japanese and Han Chinese descent.

Wen made her acting debut in television series The Kite Soaring when she was 16. She won the Golden Bell Award for Best Supporting Actress in a Miniseries or Television Film in 2014 and Best Actress in a Miniseries or Television Film award in 2017.

She has been in a relationship with actor River Huang since 2014.

Filmography

Television series

Film

Variety and reality show

Music video appearances

Awards and nominations

References

External links 

 
 

1992 births
Living people
21st-century Taiwanese actresses
Taiwanese film actresses
Taiwanese television actresses
Taiwanese people of Japanese descent
Taiwanese people of Filipino descent
Taiwanese television presenters